Kolbeinn Höður Gunnarsson (born 11 July 1995) is an Icelandic sprinter.

He won several titles at European Team Championships.
He won 14 national titles, mainly 100 m and 200 m. With 20.96, he is the national record holder of 200 m.

References

External links
IAAF Athlete’s profile

Icelandic male sprinters
1995 births
Living people
Icelandic Athletics Championships winners